Vaginulus is a genus of air-breathing land slugs, shell-less terrestrial pulmonate gastropod mollusks in the family Veronicellidae, the leatherleaf slugs.

Species 
Species in the genus Vaginulus include:
 Vaginulus buergueri (Simroth, 1914)
 Vaginulus rodericensis Smith, 1876
 Vaginulus sloanii (Cuvier, 1817)
 Vaginulus taunaisii (Férussac, 1821)

Synonyms:
 Vaginulus occidentalis (Guilding, 1825) is a synonym of Diplosolenodes occidentalis
 Vaginulus sinensis Heude, 1882 is a synonym of Rathouisia leonina Heude, 1882
 Vaginulus stuxbergi Westerlund, 1883 is a synonym of Oncis stuxbergi (Westerlund, 1883)

References 

Veronicellidae